The National Memorial Hall for Israel's Fallen is a national memorial for all soldiers who gave their lives establishing and defending the State of Israel. The memorial was commissioned by the Israeli Ministry of Defense to provide a central place of pilgrimage for all bereaved families to commemorate their lost loved ones. Daily memorial services are held to honor the anniversary of each soldier's death.

The memorial is located on Mount Herzl in Jerusalem.

Design
The hall was designed to preserve the memory of all fallen soldiers while providing visitors with both a personal and collective experience of commemoration. The hall's central atrium consists of an undulating funnel designed to symbolize a torch and an eternal flame. Approximately 23,000 bricks wrap around the hall's spiral staircase, forming a 250-meter-long "wall of names." Each brick is "individually engraved with the name of a fallen soldier, the date the soldier was killed and a candle to be lit on the anniversary of the soldier’s death."

The exterior of the hall echoes the topography of the surrounding mountain landscape.

References

See also
 Australian War Memorial
 Canadian National Vimy Memorial
 National War Memorial (Canada)
 Poklonnaya Hill
 Arlington National Cemetery
 List of Australian military memorials

Military monuments and memorials in Israel
Monuments and memorials in Mount Herzl
Buildings and structures in Jerusalem
2017 establishments in Israel